Matthew Le Nevez (born 10 January 1979) is an Australian actor. He is best known for his roles as Doctor Patrick Reid in the TV series Offspring, Detective Brian Dutch in the Tasmanian Gothic sci-fi television show The Kettering Incident and Agent Cal Isaac in the thriller drama series Absentia.

Early life 
Le Nevez was born in Canberra, Australian Capital Territory (ACT) in 1979 and attended The French-Australian Preschool, Telopea Park School and St Edmund's College, Canberra before being accepted into NIDA aged 17. He graduated in 1999.

Career
Le Nevez took a small role in Australian-made sci-fi series Farscape, followed by a part in teen drama Head Start. In 2002 he appeared in his first feature film, Garage Days, playing a drug-fuelled rock star. He then played Aaron Reynolds, accomplice to the notorious Brenden James Abbott, the Post Card Bandit, in the TV miniseries of the same name.

In 2003 came a break-through role, that of rough-and-ready Bullet Sheather in the ABC Television miniseries Marking Time, for which Le Nevez won an AFI Television Award in 2004 for Best Actor in a Supporting or Guest Role in a Television Drama or Comedy.

In 2005 Le Nevez starred in his first American film, Marvel feature film Man-Thing, as Sheriff Kyle Williams.

The film Peaches saw him sharing a screen with Hugo Weaving and Jacqueline McKenzie, but it was the 2006 role of notorious Mathew Wales (convicted of the murders of his mother Margaret Wales-King and stepfather Paul King), in the TV movie The Society Murders, that won Le Nevez critical acclaim. He won the Logie Award for Most Outstanding Actor on Australian television in 2006.

Le Nevez stars in the Australian film The Tender Hook. Written and directed by Jonathan Ogilvie, it is the story of Iris (Rose Byrne) and a love triangle that includes her roguish English lover, McHeath, and Art (Matt Le Nevez), an earnest young boxer. The film also stars his previous acting colleague, Hugo Weaving.

Le Nevez appeared as the boyfriend of "Kate" (Sibylla Budd) in the Come Walkabout commercial for Tourism Australia, directed by Baz Luhrmann.

In 2010, Le Nevez appeared in Legend of the Seeker as Leo, the new Seeker. In 2011, he became a regular in the Network Ten comedy/drama Offspring as anaesthetist Dr Patrick Reid, and continued in season 3 (2012), 4 (2013), and, after his character's death, in dream sequences during season 5 (2014) and 6(2016). Having chosen to leave the show, his character was killed off in the 12th episode of season 4. It was broadcast on 7 August 2013, and made Australian headlines following an outpouring of grief from Offspring fans.

In 2012 he played the part of Australian former cricketer Dennis Lillee in the miniseries Howzat! Kerry Packer's War about Kerry Packer's World Series Cricket.

He played the part of Damien Parer in the 2014 television film Parer's War.

In 2014, despite leaving Offspring to pursue acting in America, it was reported that Le Nevez was joining the cast of Australian T.V. series Love Child. It was announced in July 2014 that he would be co-starring in upcoming drama series The Kettering Incident.

In 2016 he starred in Brock, a Channel 10 miniseries, as Australian motor racing legend Peter Brock.

Personal life
In 2014, Le Nevez and his partner Michelle Smith welcomed their son Levi Le Nevez.

Le Nevez is an avid supporter of Richmond in the AFL and Canberra Raiders in the NRL.

Filmography

Film

Television

Awards and nominations

References

External links

Matthew Le Nevez at the National Film and Sound Archive

1978 births
Living people
AACTA Award winners
Australian male film actors
Australian male television actors
Australian people of Spanish descent
Logie Award winners
Male actors from Canberra
21st-century Australian male actors